Srini Kumar (srini), is the founder of the Unamerican.com website in 1994, which sold stickers and other paraphernalia showcasing counterculture. Srini has written the book StickerNation, a book of 432 stickers published by Disinformation. He is also bassist and frontman for the San Francisco surf-rock band the Aquamen. He also founded the Webzine online magazine conference series in 1998.

He is also the creator of Tinyvox application. Tinyvox turns Facebook, Twitter, email and message boards into a huge voicemail system.

References

15 Questions for Srini Kumar, interview by The 15 Minutes Project, July 1998
Young Indian American Dreams Up 'Unamerican' Shock Therapy. interview by Rediff, May 1999
Unamerican.com: The truth in 5 words or less, interview with Spite, October 1998
Anarchy's Ad Agency (broken link) (10 Mar 2007 archive copy of first page) Interview with The Heights (Boston College student magazine), November 2000
A New Era In U.S. Security, CBS News, May 2002

Living people
Stickers
Year of birth missing (living people)